Louie John Annesley (born 3 May 2000) is a British professional footballer who plays as a centre-back for League of Ireland Premier Division side Dundak and the Gibraltar national team. For the national team, he has also been utilised as a holding midfielder.

Club career

Early career

As a youth Annesley spent time with both AFC Wimbledon and Chelsea.
Annesley started his senior career at non-League side Cobham, breaking into the senior side and making ten appearances in his only season at the club in the Combined Counties Football League. This attracted the attention of Barnet, who signed him to their academy in 2017. He left in early 2018, signing for Gibraltar Premier Division champions Lincoln Red Imps in July 2018. He made his debut on 26 July 2018 in the UEFA Europa League first leg against The New Saints.

Blackburn Rovers and loans

In January 2019, despite only playing three league games for the Red Imps and primarily featuring in their Intermediate League squad, he signed for EFL Championship side Blackburn Rovers on a deal until June 2021, initially to play in their development side. Annesley made his Rovers under-23 debut on 4 February, coming off the bench for the final 18 minutes of his side's 7–1 victory over Leicester City in the Premier League 2. He picked up his first piece of silverware at Rovers on 7 May 2019, when he started in the 2–0 Lancashire Senior Cup final victory over local rivals Burnley. He captained the U23s for the first time on 8 March 2021, also scoring his first goal in a 5–1 win over Southampton B in the Premier League 2. In June 2021, he signed a new two year contract with the club.

On 29 October 2021, Annesley joined National League side, Woking on loan until 4 December 2021 and made his debut a day later, in a 3–2 home victory over Altrincham, playing the full 90 minutes. On 6 December 2021, his loan was extended for a further month until the new year, following five first-team appearances. On 5 January 2022, Annesley's loan was extended once more, this time until the end of the current campaign. On 25 January 2022, during a 1–0 away defeat to Bromley, Annesley was sent off for the first time in his playing career, receiving two yellows in the space of two minutes.

In the 2022–23 season, Annesley was elevated to the first team squad for the first time, being given the number 39 shirt. He made his debut in the Carabao Cup second round tie against Bradford City on 23 August 2022, playing the full game and making a crucial late block to ensure a 2–1 victory for Blackburn.

On 22 November 2022, Annesley rejoined National League side, Barnet on loan until 20 December 2022.

Dundalk

On 10 January 2023, Annesley signed a multi-year contract for League of Ireland Premier Division side Dundalk FC. After registering an assist on his debut against UCD, he scored his first goal for the club on 3 March in the 15th minute of a 5–0 in over St Patrick's Athletic.

International career
Annesley is the first player to have represented Gibraltar at every level from U16 to senior level, first appearing for the under-16 side in March 2015 while on the books at Chelsea. Later that year, he made his debut for the Gibraltar U17 national team, with whom he earned five caps. In 2016, he played three games for the Gibraltar U19 before earning a call up for the first Gibraltar U21 in 2017, with whom he has eight caps to date. Annesley notably made a late goal-line clearance in Gibraltar U21s' 1–0 victory over North Macedonia.

In March 2018, Annesley made his debut for the senior national team, starting at the last minute after an injury to Joseph Chipolina in the warm-up. He was substituted in the second half as they held on for a 1–0 win over Latvia. He earned his second senior cap on 13 October, coming off the bench in another 1–0 victory, this time away at Armenia to win Gibraltar's first competitive points at senior level.

Personal life
Annesley was born in St. Helier, London, and was educated at Wimbledon College.

Career statistics

Club

International

International goals

Honours
Blackburn Rovers
Lancashire Senior Cup: 2018–19, 2019–20

References

External links
 
 World Football

2000 births
Living people
Gibraltarian footballers
Gibraltar international footballers
English footballers
English people of Gibraltarian descent
Association football defenders
AFC Wimbledon players
Barnet F.C. players
Blackburn Rovers F.C. players
Chelsea F.C. players
Cobham F.C. players
Woking F.C. players
Lincoln Red Imps F.C. players
Dundalk F.C. players
National League (English football) players 
Gibraltar under-21 international footballers
Gibraltar youth international footballers
Footballers from the London Borough of Sutton